In homotopy theory, a branch of algebraic topology, a Postnikov system (or Postnikov tower) is a way of decomposing a topological space's homotopy groups using an inverse system of topological spaces whose homotopy type at degree  agrees with the truncated homotopy type of the original space . Postnikov systems were introduced by, and are named after, Mikhail Postnikov.

Definition 
A Postnikov system of a path-connected space  is an inverse system of spaces

with a sequence of maps  compatible with the inverse system such that

 The map  induces an isomorphism  for every .
 Each map  is a fibration, and so the fiber  is an Eilenberg–MacLane space, .

The first two conditions imply that  is also a -space. Note the third condition is only included optionally by some authors.

Existence 
,
showing that  is a CW approximation of its inverse limit. They can be constructed on a CW complex by iteratively killing off homotopy groups. If we have a map  representing a homotopy class , we can take the pushout along the boundary map , killing off the homotopy class. For  this process can be repeated for all , giving a space which has vanishing homotopy groups .

Main property 
One of the main properties of the Postnikov tower, which makes it so powerful to study while computing cohomology, is the fact the spaces  are homotopic to a CW complex  which differs from  only by cells of dimension .

Homotopy classification of fibrations 
The sequence of fibrations  have homotopically defined invariants, meaning the homotopy classes of maps , give a well defined homotopy type . The homotopy class of  comes from looking at the homotopy class of the classifying map for the fiber . The associated classifying map is
,
hence the homotopy class  is classified by a homotopy class

Fiber sequence for spaces with two nontrivial homotopy groups 
One of the special cases of the homotopy classification is the homotopy class of spaces  such that there exists a fibration

Then, from the previous discussion, the fibration map  gives a cohomology class in
,
which can also be interpreted as a group cohomology class. This space  can be considered a higher local system.

Examples of Postnikov towers

Postnikov tower of a K(G,n) 
One of the conceptually simplest cases of a Postnikov tower is that of the Eilenberg–Maclane space . This gives a tower with

Postnikov tower of S2 
The Postnikov tower for the sphere  is a special case whose first few terms can be understood explicitly.

Then, and  comes from a pullback sequence

which is an element in
.
If this was trivial it would imply . But, this is not the case! In fact, this is responsible for why strict infinity groupoids don't model homotopy types. Computing this invariant requires more work, but can be explicitly found. This is the quadratic form  on  coming from the Hopf fibration . Note that each element in  gives a different homotopy 3-type.

Homotopy groups of spheres 
One application of the Postnikov tower is the computation of homotopy groups of spheres. Recall there is a spectral sequence for any Serre fibration, such as the fibration
.

We can then form a homological spectral sequence with -terms
.

,

equivalently written as
.

Postnikov towers of spectra 
In addition to the classical Postnikov tower, there is a notion of Postnikov towers in stable homotopy theory constructed on spectrapg 85-86.

Definition 
,
with maps

commuting with the  maps. Then, this tower is a Postnikov tower if the following two conditions are satisfied:

where  are stable homotopy groups of a spectrum. It turns out every spectrum has a Postnikov tower and this tower can be constructed using a similar kind of inductive procedure as the one given above.

Whitehead tower 
Given a CW complex , there is a dual construction to the Postnikov tower called the Whitehead tower. Instead of killing off all higher homotopy groups, the Whitehead tower iteratively kills off lower homotopy groups. This is given by a tower of CW complexes,
,
where

 The maps  are fibrations with fiber .

Implications 
Notice  is the universal cover of  since it is a covering space with a simply connected cover.

Construction 
The spaces  in the Whitehead tower are constructed inductively. If we let
 

for some fixed basepoint , then the induced map  is a fiber bundle with fiber homeomorphic to
,

and so we have a Serre fibration
.

,

where if the middle morphism is an isomorphism, the other two groups are zero. This can be checked by looking at the inclusion  and noting that the Eilenberg–Maclane space has a cellular decomposition
; thus,
,

giving the desired result.

As a homotopy fiber 
Another way to view the components in the Whitehead tower is as a homotopy fiber. If we take
 

from the Postnikov tower, we get a space  which has

Whitehead tower of spectra 
The dual notion of the Whitehead tower can be defined in a similar manner using homotopy fibers in the category of spectra. If we let
 

then this can be organized in a tower giving connected covers of a spectrum. This is a widely used construction in bordism theory because the coverings of the unoriented cobordism spectrum  gives other bordism theories

such as string bordism.

Whitehead tower and string theory 
In Spin geometry the  group is constructed as the universal cover of the Special orthogonal group , so  is a fibration, giving the first term in the Whitehead tower.

See also 

 Adams spectral sequence
 Eilenberg–MacLane space
 CW complex
Obstruction theory
 Stable homotopy theory
 Homotopy groups of spheres
 Higher group

References

 
Lecture Notes on Homotopy Theory and Applications
Determination of the Second Homology and Cohomology Groups of a Space by Means of Homotopy Invariants - gives accessible examples of postnikov invariants
 

Homotopy theory